Hollywood Safari is a 1997 American film, starring John Savage, Ted Jan Roberts, Don Wilson, David Leisure and Debby Boone. It was directed by Henri Charr and written by Robert Newcastle, Henri Charr and Jess Mancilla. The film generated a spin-off, the TV series Hollywood Safari (1998-2001).

Plot
The film revolves around an animal trainer and his family

Cast
 John Savage as Deputy Rogers
 Ted Jan Roberts as Josh Johnson
 Don Wilson as Greg
 David Leisure as Troy Johnson
 Debby Boone as Jane Johnson
 Ryan J. O'Neill as Peter Johnson
 Kenneth Tigar as Sheriff Todd

Reception

References

External links
 
 
 All Movie

1997 films
1990s English-language films
American action adventure films
1990s American films